Hayanari (written:  or ) is a masculine Japanese given name. Notable people with the name include:

, Japanese racing driver
, Japanese government official and calligrapher

Japanese masculine given names